The  Blue Mountains Shale Cap Forest is a wet-sclerophyll temperate forest community predominantly found in the Blue Mountains, particularly in the Wollemi National Park, and parts of the Hawkesbury.

Ecology
Main tree species include Eucalyptus deanei, Eucalyptus cypellocarpa and Syncarpia glomulifera. Remainder tree species are Angophora costata, Angophora floribunda, Eucalyptus notabilis, Eucalyptus piperita and Eucalyptus punctata. The biome, now extensively cleared, was originally a tall open forest and now survives as woodland or as groups of remnant trees.

The Eucalyptus deanei (mountain blue gum) is a leading supplier of tree hollows for owls, parrots, gliders and other hollow dependent animals including the threatened species Powerful Owl and Glossy Black-Cockatoo.

Geography
The community lies on deep fertile soils on the Wianamatta Shale, typically within damp sheltered areas at lower to middle altitudes of the Blue Mountains and Wollemi areas. Wollondilly also has a similar community. The biome supports diverse mammals and birds than the lower, drier eucalypt forests and woodlands of the Blue Mountains.

See also
Blue Gum High Forest

References 

Forests of New South Wales
Vegetation of Australia
Environment of New South Wales
Eastern Australian temperate forests
Temperate broadleaf and mixed forests
Ecoregions of New South Wales
Sclerophyll forests